Liz and Lisa – Days Were Different is an album by Elizabeth Mitchell and Lisa Loeb, released in 1990.

Track listing
"Tumbling Man"
"Yesterday's Child"
"Train Songs"
"Summer"
"Blue World"
"Indians"
"Dance With the Angels"
"Fiesta"
"It Takes a Lot to Love Her"
"Do You Sleep"
"Dancing on Keyes"
"River"

References

1990 albums
Lisa Loeb albums
Elizabeth Mitchell (musician) albums